Jake Leschyshyn (born March 10, 1999) is an American-born Canadian professional ice hockey forward for the Hartford Wolf Pack of the American Hockey League (AHL) as a prospect to the New York Rangers of the National Hockey League (NHL). Leschyshyn played junior hockey for the Lethbridge Hurricanes and Regina Pats in the Western Hockey League, serving as captain of the latter in 2018–19, and previously played in the NHL for the Vegas Golden Knights.

Early life
Leschyshyn was born on March 10, 1999, in Raleigh, North Carolina to parents Curtis and Laura. As his father played for the Colorado Avalanche of the National Hockey League, Leschyshyn started playing ice hockey in the state. He participated in organized ice hockey in Colorado from 2004 until 2011 when his family moved to Saskatchewan. Prior to the move, Leschyshyn played with the Colorado Thunderbirds' U12 Pee Wee Major Team.

Playing career

Amateur
Upon moving to Saskatchewan, Leschyshyn played his second year of pee wee AA, as well as bantam AA and midget AAA, in Saskatoon. While playing with the Saskatoon Bantam AA Stallions of the Saskatchewan Midget Hockey League in the 2013–14 season, Leschyshyn accumulated 31 goals and 28 assists. As a result of his play, Leschyshyn was drafted sixth overall by the Red Deer Rebels in the 2015 WHL Bantam Draft. Although Leschyshyn signed with the Rebels in July 2014, he was re-assigned to the Saskatoon Blazers of the Saskatchewan Midget Hockey League for the 2014–15 season after attending their training camp. While with the Blazers, he collected 15 goals and 20 assists for 35 points through 38 games. In January 2015, Leschyshyn's WHL playing rights were traded to the Regina Pats in exchange for Connor Gay, a 2016 1st Round pick, 2015 2nd Round pick, and 2017 7th Round pick. As such, Leschyshyn played earned a two-game call up from the Pats in February which saw him make his WHL debut and score his first WHL goal.

Major junior
Upon concluding the 2014–15 season with the Blazers, Leschyshyn joined the Pats full-time in March 2015 for the remainder of their games. He re-joined the Pats for the 2015–16 season where he immediately made an impact on the team by scoring his first WHL hat-trick on November 27, 2015.

Professional
Drafted by the Golden Knights in 2017, he signed an entry level contract on June 1, 2018 and played his first NHL game on October 14, 2021.

Leschyshyn was waived by Vegas for assignment to the AHL on January 10, 2023 after not registering a point in 22 games; however, he was claimed off waivers the next day by the New York Rangers.

Career statistics

Regular season and playoffs

International

References

External links

1999 births
Living people
Canadian ice hockey centres
Chicago Wolves players
Hartford Wolf Pack players
Henderson Silver Knights players
Lethbridge Hurricanes players
New York Rangers players
Regina Pats players
Vegas Golden Knights draft picks
Vegas Golden Knights players